Luis Lobo and Javier Sánchez were the defending champions but only Lobo competed that year with Pablo Albano.

Albano and Lobo won in the final 6–4, 6–1 against Ģirts Dzelde and Udo Plamberger.

Seeds
Champion seed is indicated in bold text while text in italics indicates the round in which those seeds were eliminated.

 Libor Pimek /  Byron Talbot (first round)
 Pablo Albano /  Luis Lobo (champions)
 John-Laffnie de Jager /  David Ekerot (quarterfinals)
 Petr Pála /  David Rikl (semifinals)

Draw

External links
 1996 Croatia Open Doubles draw

Croatia Open
1996 ATP Tour